The Year's Best Science Fiction: Fifteenth Annual Collection is a science fiction anthology edited by Gardner Dozois that was published in 1999.  It is the 15th in The Year's Best Science Fiction series.

Contents

The book includes a 49-page summation by Dozois; 28 stories, all that first appeared in 1997, and each with a two-paragraph introduction by Dozois; and a seven-page referenced list of honorable mentions for the year. The stories are as follows.

Robert Silverberg: "Beauty in the Night"
Paul J. McAuley: "Second Skin"
Nancy Kress: "Steamship Soldier on the Information Front"
Greg Egan: "Reasons to Be Cheerful"
Stephen Baxter: "Moon Six"
Bill Johnson: "We Will Drink a Fish Together..."
Peter F. Hamilton: "Escape Route"
James Patrick Kelly: "Itsy Bitsy Spider"
Alastair Reynolds: "A Spy in Europa"
William Sanders: "The Undiscovered"
Alan Brennert: "Echoes"
David Marusek: "Getting to Know You"
Gwyneth Jones: "Balinese Dancer"
Robert Reed: "Marrow"
Howard Waldrop: "Heart of Whitenesse"
Michael Swanwick: "The Wisdom of Old Earth"
Brian Stableford: "The Pipes of Pan"
G. David Nordley: "Crossing Chao Meng Fu"
Greg Egan: "Yeyuka"
Carolyn Ives Gilman: "Frost Painting"
Walter Jon Williams: "Lethe"
Geoffrey A. Landis: "Winter Fire"
Ian R. MacLeod: "Nevermore"
Simon Ings: "Open Veins"
Ian McDonald: "After Kerry"
Sean Williams and Simon Brown: "The Masque of Agamemnon" 
John Kessel: "Gulliver at Home"
Gregory Benford and Elisabeth Malartre: "A Cold Dry Cradle"

External links
Story synapses by Brian Davies (scroll down)
Review of Fifteenth Annual by Steven H. Silver

1998 anthologies
15
St. Martin's Press books